Debre Sina, now Borena Sayint (Amharic: ደብረ ሲና "Mount Sinai"/ ቦረና ሣይንት) is a woreda in Amhara Region, Ethiopia. Part of the Debub Wollo Zone, Debre Sina is bordered on the south by Wegde, on the west by the Abbay River which separates it from the Misraq Gojjam Zone, on the north by Mehal Sayint, on the northeast by Sayint, and on the east by Legambo. The administrative center is Mekane Selam; other towns in Debre Sina include Amsale Genet.

The altitude of this woreda ranges from 500 meters above sea level at the bottom of the canyon of the Abay to 3200 meters in the northeast corner. Rivers include the Defarsa, Donqoto, Endras, Lagadaba, and Yashum. Forested areas include the Denkoro Forest, a forest remnant on the eastern side of Denkoro river gorge with an elevation stretching from 2,400 to 3,000 meters above sea level. The lowest portions are dominated by Podocarpus falcatus and Juniperus procera, which are replaced with Rapanea and Dombeya as the elevation rises, and are in turn replaced by Erica arborea and Hypericum revolutum midway up through the forest, and eventually dominate by the highest portion. Dombeya and Erica are both important for the cultivation of honey.

The southern part of this woreda was detached in summer 1994 to create Wegde woreda.

Demographics
Based on the 2007 national census conducted by the Central Statistical Agency of Ethiopia (CSA), this woreda has a total population of 158,209, an increase of 26.44% over the 1994 census, of whom 78,621 are men and 79,588 women; 8,709 or 5.50% are urban inhabitants. With an area of 1,027.61 square kilometers, Debre Sina has a population density of 153.96, which is greater than the Zone average of 147.58 persons per square kilometer. A total of 37,193 households were counted in this woreda, resulting in an average of 4.25 persons to a household, and 36,006 housing units. The majority of the inhabitants said they practiced Ethiopian Orthodox Christianity, with 55.52% reporting that as their religion, while 44.38% of the population were Muslim.

The 1994 national census reported a total population for this woreda of 125,126 in 28,461 households, of whom 62,036 were men and 63,090 were women; 5,509 or 4.4% of its population were urban dwellers. The two largest ethnic groups reported in Were Babu were the Amhara (98.75%), and the Oromo (1.19%); all other ethnic groups made up 0.06% of the population. Amharic was spoken as a first language by 99.87%. The majority of the inhabitants professed Ethiopian Orthodox Christianity, with 57.79% having reported they practiced that belief, while 41.99% of the population said they were Muslim.

Notes

Districts of Amhara Region